Evolution (stylized as EVOLution) is the second studio album by American singer Sabrina Carpenter, released on October 14, 2016, by Hollywood Records. Sabrina began recording the album in 2015, shortly after the launch of her first studio album, Eyes Wide Open until 2016. Musically, Evolution is a dance-pop record, which departs from the folk-pop and teen pop sound of its predecessor.

The album received positive reviews from music critics, commercially the album debuted at number 28 on the US Billboard 200 and sold 11,500 copies in its first week.

"On Purpose" was released as the lead single from Evolution on July 29, 2016. It was followed by promotional singles "All We Have Is Love" and "Run and Hide" shortly before the album's release. "Thumbs" was the second and last single released from the album. The album was promoted with several appearances and performances. To further promote the album, Carpenter embarked on her first headlining concert tour, "Evolution Tour" in the fall as well as "The De-Tour" during Summer.

Singles
The lead single from the album, "On Purpose", was released on July 29, 2016. "Thumbs" impacted Top 40 radio as the second single from the album on January 3, 2017.

Promotional singles
The album was made available for pre-order and the first promotional single, titled "All We Have Is Love", was released on September 23, 2016. "Run and Hide" was released as the second promotional single on September 30, 2016.

Tour
Carpenter embarked on the Evolution Tour through America to promote the album. It kicked off on October 18 and ended on December 13. Another one followed called "The De-Tour", in which she toured both America and Canada during the Summer, featuring Alex Aiono and New Hope Club as special guests.

Critical reception

Evolution was met with positive reviews, with critics complimenting Carpenter's sense of maturity and growth on the album in comparison to her debut album. Christine M. Sellers of The Celebrity Cafe wrote that Carpenter "proves she's not just another Disney darling transitioning through her teenage years" and that the album "showcases Carpenter's growth as both a songwriter and a vocalist". Brittany Goldfield Rodrigues of Andpop gave the album 3.8 thumbs up, saying that "with Evolution, Sabrina is showing a mature musical side, willing to experiment with techno beats, lyrics and what she can do vocally. She provides an interesting indie yet synth take on pop music, and has clearly found a unique sound that she shines in, that separates her from the rest". Matt Collar from AllMusic gave the album a rating of 3.5 out of 5, noting its dance-pop sound and describing it as a "mix of heartfelt acoustic balladry, R&B-influenced pop, and dance-oriented anthems.

Commercial performance 
Evolution debuted at number 28 on the US Billboard 200 and sold 11,500 copies in its first week.

Track listing

Credits and personnel
Credits adapted from the liner notes of Evolution.

Recorded, engineered, mixed and mastered at

 Santa Monica, California 
 North Hollywood, California 
 London, United Kingdom 
 Hollywood, California 
 Los Angeles, California 
 New York City

Performers and production

 Sabrina Carpenter – vocals ; backing vocals 
 Ido Zmishlany – production, engineering ; additional vocal engineering ; mixing 
 Nolan Wescott – piano, vocal engineering 
 Serban Ghenea – mixing 
 Erik Madrid – mixing 
 Jorge Gutierrez – mixing assistant 
 Steve Mac – production 
 Priscilla Renea – backing vocals 
 Chris Laws – engineering 
 Dan Pursey – engineering 
 Mitch Allan – lead vocals recording 
 Phil Tan – mixing 
 Jimmy Robbins – production, engineering 
 Ryan Ogren – production, engineering, guitar, synth, bass, programming, backing vocals 
 Halatrax – production, engineering, programming, backing vocals 
 Nick Bailey – backing vocals 
 Rob Persaud – production, engineering 
 DJ Daylight – production, engineering 
 Afshin Salmani – production, engineering, mixing, backing vocals 
 Josh Cumbee – production, engineering, mixing, backing vocals 
 Chris Gehringer – mastering

Design
 David Snow – creative direction
 Anabel Sinn – art direction, design
 Harper Smith – photography

Charts

Release history

References

Hollywood Records albums
Sabrina Carpenter albums
2016 albums